Hartwood Manor, also known as Old Foote Place, is a historic home located at Hartwood, Stafford County, Virginia.  It was built in 1848, and is a -story, three bay Gothic Revival style brick dwelling.  It has a rear ell added in 1967. It features a steeply-pitched, cross-gable roof; one-story, polygonal bay windows; pointed and square-arched drip moldings; modified lancet-arch windows; and deep eaves with exposed rafter ends. The property includes the contributing frame barn, a concrete block milk house, a frame chicken house, and a frame workshop, all dated to the early-20th century.  A contributing hand-dug well dates to the mid-19th century.

It was listed on the National Register of Historic Places in 2006.

References

Houses on the National Register of Historic Places in Virginia
Gothic Revival architecture in Virginia
Houses completed in 1848
National Register of Historic Places in Stafford County, Virginia
Houses in Stafford County, Virginia